Bayard Taylor Redstone (March 13, 1879 – September 17, 1969) was the mayor of Vero Beach, Florida from December 12, 1923, to December 15, 1927. He was a member of the Florida House of Representatives from Indian River County from 1928 to 1933.

He was born in New Brunswick, Canada, the son of Charles G. and Alice Redstone.

He was the President of Redstone Lumber & Supply Company, and together with George Paddison formed the East Coast Retail Lumber Dealers Association in 1917.

References 

1879 births
1969 deaths
Businesspeople in timber
Mayors of Vero Beach, Florida
Democratic Party members of the Florida House of Representatives
People from New Brunswick
Canadian emigrants to the United States